Annelise Reenberg (16 September 1919 – 12 December 1994) was a Danish cinematographer, film director and screenwriter. She directed 23 films between 1950 and 1971.

Filmography (selected) 

  (1950)
 24 timer (1951)
 Fra den gamle Købmandsgaard (1951)
 The Old Mill on Mols (1953)
 Hendes store aften (1954)
  (1955)
  (1956)
  (1957)
 Styrmand Karlsen (1958)
 Baronessen fra benzintanken (1960)
 Peters baby (1961)
 Han, Hun, Dirch og Dario (1962)
 Venus fra Vestø (1962)
 Frøken Nitouche (1963)
  (1964)
 En ven i bolignøden (1965)
  (1965)
 Min søsters børn (1966)
  (1967)
 Min søsters børn vælter byen (1968)
  (1969)
 Hurra for de blå husarer (1970)
 Min søsters børn, når de er værst (1971)

References

External links 
 

1919 births
1994 deaths
20th-century Danish women writers
20th-century Danish writers
20th-century screenwriters
Bodil Honorary Award recipients
Danish women screenwriters
Danish women film directors
Film directors from Copenhagen